Captain Vorpatril's Alliance is a science fiction novel by American writer Lois McMaster Bujold, part of the Vorkosigan Saga. The action centers on Miles Vorkosigan's cousin Ivan Vorpatril, now a captain, and a Jackson's Whole refugee called Tej. By internal chronology, the book is set a year or so after Diplomatic Immunity (2002), about four years before Cryoburn (2010).

Plot 

During a stay in the planet Komarr, Captain Ivan Vorpatril is recruited by Byerly Vorrutyer, an undercover agent of Imperial Security, to find out the identity of a young woman named Tej, connected to his investigation, who he believes may be in danger. 

Ivan visits her workplace and flirts with her, asking her on a date, but he is rejected. After he follows her back to her building, she lets him into her apartment and he is attacked by her companion, a genetically modified woman named Rish. He spends the night tied to a chair in their apartment while they decide what to do with him. When two men break into the apartment Ivan manages to alert the women, who stun the intruders. Ivan then offers his own flat as a safe place for them.

The women's persecutors accuse them of illegally entering Komarr and simultaneously accuse Ivan of kidnapping them, using the police investigation of these crimes to track them. A few days later, while the police are breaking into his apartment, Ivan hastily marries Tej and hires Rish as her employee, to give them both a legal status in Komarr. 

Tej reveals that she is the youngest daughter of Baron Cordonah from Jackson's Whole, a planet based on laissez-faire free market economics where what would be illegal activities elsewhere abound. House Cordonah had been recently taken over by force by a competitor, who put a price on the life or capture of the remaining members of the House, making bounty hunters track them all the way to Komarr. Now as part of the family of a High Vor lord, Tej and Rish travel with Ivan to Barrayar, where the two women can be more secure.

Back in Barrayar, Rish gets involved romantically with Byerly. Tej and Ivan attempt to get a divorce by petition to Count Falco Vorpatril, but are rejected.  Falco tells Ivan that he will have to face the consequences of his own actions for a change.  Ivan and Tej begin developing feelings for each other, until unexpectedly Tej's entire family arrives. Under the cover of reuniting with them, their relatives have come to Barrayar to acquire the financial resources needed to attempt to take back their House. 

Tej's grandmother, a former Cetagandan haut lady, knows of an underground bunker forgotten since the Cetagandan invasion of Barrayar had been defeated a century before. It is filled with looted treasure, but they discover that Imperial Security's headquarters inadvertently were built just across the street from where the bunker is buried. 

They use a genetically modified fungus to dig their way into the bunker without noise or electronic signals that would alert Imperial Security (ImpSec). Just as they are ready to enter the bunker to retrieve the treasures, Ivan figures out the scheme and confronts Tej, who manages to secure his help. The scheme falls apart when the smuggler the baron had hired to transport the treasure trove proves to be more interested in the bounty on the family, and in the confrontation a long-forgotten buried bomb explodes, trapping them all in the bunker. 

While the bunker is flooding, Ivan and Tej confess their mutual feelings for each other and resolve to stay together. Barrayaran Imperial forces rescue them and secure the bunker and its contents, but the foundations of ImpSec Headquarters are compromised and the building sinks several levels below ground. Emperor Gregor negotiates a deal with Baron Cordonah: in exchange for one tenth of the bunker's contents and a ship to return to Jackson's whole, House Cordonah becomes a covert ally of Barrayar, offering Barrayaran agents safe haven in Jackson's Whole. 

To avoid the scandal of the attempted theft, Byerly is exiled to Jackson's Whole with the Cordonahs, while Ivan is assigned as a diplomatic aide to planet Ylla. The book ends with Ivan and Tej reading letters from their families and planning their future.

Reception
Captain Vorpatril's Alliance was a finalist for the 2013 Hugo Award for Best Novel. At Tor.com, Jo Walton described it as "adorable as a whole", "deeply readable and tons of fun", and "also a really remarkably good science fiction novel", comparing it to Georgette Heyer's Cotillion, while at Locus Online, Paul Di Filippo compared it to a Gilbert and Sullivan farce, and to a "lighthearted and absurd" version of the works of C. J. Cherryh, complimenting Bujold's execution in alternating the viewpoint between Ivan and Tej. The SF Site's Steven H Silver, conversely, felt that the alternating viewpoint was not executed as well as it could have been, and that Ivan "makes a better support[ing] character than a primary character"; Silver conceded, however, that Ivan and Tej may "seem less than dynamic merely in comparison to Bujold's more typical protagonists".

Publication history 
From June 2012, the book was sold as a non-proofread advance reader e-book (e-ARC). The official print release was November 2012.

References

External links

2012 American novels
2012 science fiction novels
American science fiction novels
Novels by Lois McMaster Bujold
Vorkosigan Saga
Baen Books books